Alma Hanlon  (April 30, 1890 – October 26, 1977) was an American silent film actress. Hanlon's film career was short, lasting only four years. She appeared in twenty-three films. Her first film role was as Dorothy Dare in The Fixer (1915) and her last was in The Profiteer (1919).

Biography
She was born on April 30, 1890, in New Jersey, the youngest daughter of George Hanlon.

Her first husband was former correspondent and theatrical press agent Walter J. Kingsley, from 1905 until their divorce in 1917, with whom she had one child, Dorothy Kingsley (1909–1997).

In 1918 she married  director Louis Myll (1871–1939), when she had been living at Bayside, Queens for the last two years. She later moved with her daughter to the affluent suburb of Grosse Pointe, Michigan.

She died on October 26, 1977, in Monterey, California

Partial filmography
 The Fixer (1915)
 The Weakness of Man (1916)
 Gold and the Woman (1916)
 The Whip (1917)
 The Golden God (1917)
 Public Defender (1917)
 The Profiteer (1919)

References

External links

1890 births
1977 deaths
Actresses from New Jersey
Actresses from New York (state)
American silent film actresses
20th-century American actresses